BLV Group Corporation is a New York-based luxury real estate investment, development and management company.  It also provides lifestyle, air and yacht charter, philanthropy, fund management, consultancy and hospitality services in the United States, Europe, and Asia.

BLV Group brands include BLV Reality, Essenza Style and BLV Wish Foundation.  BLV Reality develops and manages luxury residential, mixed use and commercial real estate.  Essenza Style designs luxury homes, hotels and spas, and maintains commercial interests in fashion brands and cosmetics.

BLV Group Corporation was founded in 2004 by Raheem J. Brennerman, an experienced investor and philanthropist with interests in energy and real estate, and a team of stylists, interior designers and architects. BLV Group has a diversified global client base that includes multinational corporations, sovereign entities and high net worth individuals.  It maintains a presence in several cities throughout the United States, as well as in London, and Hong Kong, and plans to expand into China, Brazil, the Middle East, and Africa.

References

External links
BLV Group Corporation official website

Companies based in Manhattan
Real estate companies of the United States